Châlette-sur-Loing is a commune in the Loiret department in north-central France.

Geography
The commune is crossed by two rivers, the Loing and the Solin, and three canals, the Canal du Loing, the Canal de Briare and the Canal d'Orléans.

Population

See also
 Communes of the Loiret department

References

Chalettesurloing